Herbert Gibson (1896–1954) was a British politician.

Herbert Gibson may also refer to:

Sir Herbert Gibson, 1st Baronet, of Great Warley (1851–1932), English lawyer, president of the Law Society – see Gibson baronets
Sir Herbert Gibson, 1st Baronet, of Linconia and Faccombe (1863–1934), British-Argentinian merchant and agriculturist

See also
George Herbert Gibson (1846–1921), Anglo-Australian writer of humorous ballads and verse
Gibson (surname)